Pir Mahal railway station is located in town of Pir Mahal district of Toba Tek Singh, Pakistan.

See also
 List of railway stations in Pakistan
 Pakistan Railways

References

External links

Railway stations in Toba Tek Singh District
Railway stations on Shorkot–Sheikhupura line